The Betting Act 1953, is a Malaysian law enacted to suppress betting houses and betting in public places.

Structure
The Betting Act 1953, in its current form (1 January 2006), consists of 22 sections and no schedule (including 6 amendments), without separate parts.
 Section 1: Short title
 Section 2: Interpretation
 Section 3: Nuisance
 Section 4: Offences relating to common betting houses and betting information centres
 Section 5: Advancing money for conducting
 Section 6: Betting in a common betting house, and book-making
 Section 6A: Penalty for publication or announcement of result of a horse race
 Section 7: Money paid recoverable
 Section 8: Presumption against person accepting or receiving stakes, etc.
 Section 9: Presumption against house and occupier
 Section 9A: Presumptions against betting information centre and occupier
 Section 10: Presumption against house, occupier, and owner
 Section 11: Order for demolition of structural contrivances for facilitating betting
 Section 12: Search warrant against premises
 Section 13: Search warrant against persons
 Section 13A: Arrest and search upon suspicion
 Section 14: Magistrate, Justice of the Peace or Senior Police Officer may search
 Section 14A: Evidence by police officer to be presumptive evidence
 Section 15: Protection of informers from discovery
 Section 16: Examination of offenders
 Section 17: Binding over on second conviction
 Section 18: Trial
 Section 19: Stakes
 Section 20: Exemption from Act
 Section 21: Reward to informer
 Section 22: (Omitted)

References

External links
 Betting Act 1953 

1953 in Malaya
Legal history of British Malaya
1953 in law
Malaysian federal legislation